Hullahalli  is a village in the southern state of Karnataka, India. It is located in the Nanjangud taluk of Mysore district in Karnataka. 

Kapila river flows across the village. The village is known for an ancient Varadaraja Temple and Vishwaguru Veerabhadreshwaraswamy Sannidi or Trunapuri Shree Mahadeshwaraswamy Sannidi, located along south bank of Kapila River.

Hullahalli dam is located little upstream along River Kabini.

Education
There are government schools and colleges for school and college students including PU and degree.

Demographics
 India census, Hullahalli had a population of 1100 with 498 males and 418 females.

Image gallery

See also
 Nanjangud
 Golur Bridge

References

External links

Villages in Mysore district